Philip Michel Frans "Filip" Dewinter (born 11 September 1962) is a Belgian politician. He is one of the leading members of Vlaams Belang, a right-wing Flemish nationalist and secessionist political party. Together with Hugo Coveliers of the VLOTT party, Dewinter formed a list cartel for the city elections of Antwerp on 8 October 2006.

Family background
His father was studying medicine at the Leuven University during the Second World War, when he had to hide, as the threat of being deported by the Germans increased. He was nevertheless arrested and already after a few months of imprisonment in Bruges, had been deported to Germany to work in a munitions factory. He returned, after the war, sick and emaciated and unable to take up his studies again.

Dewinter's grandfather on his mother's side was a resistance fighter who had been very active in the resistance group, the Witte Brigade (White Brigade), in Blankenberge.

Political career
Dewinter was already politically active during his high school years at the Sint-Franciscus-Xaverius instituut in Bruges. In 1978, as a 16-year-old, he founded the Flemish Student Action Group (Vlaamse Studenten Actie Groep), that later was transformed into the Nationalist Young Students League (Nationalistisch Jong Studenten Verbond). In that year he was briefly a member of the Flemish People's Party (Vlaamse Volkspartij). In September 1982, he moved to Antwerp, where he did not complete his first year (candidate) in political and social sciences at the University of Antwerp, and became a member of the Nationalist Student Society (Nationalistische Studentenvereniging), one of the ideological seminaries of the Vlaams Belang. In 1983, he became a member of the Flemish Block (Vlaams Blok). He completed a journalist degree at the Erasmus College (Erasmus Handelsschool) in 1985. In November 1987, he was elected member of the Belgian parliament, in which he formed
a political faction with Gerolf Annemans (who, earlier that year, had succeeded to founder-Flemish Block president Karel Dillen). Under Dewinter's leadership, the parliamentary group continued to grow, notably in 1991, when the Flemish Block, from a small party, grew to about 12% of the voters. This growth has continued ever since, though it success is starting to decline due to the rise of other parties like e.g. Lijst Dedecker.

In 1988, he also became a City councilman in Antwerp. When the Flemish Parliament and the Belgian Parliament got elected separately in 1995, he chose to be a member of the Flemish Parliament (which deals with a lot of regional matters). His hard statements on especially foreign migration provided for victories in the elections of 1999 and 2003 for the Flemish Parliament. Dewinter was, together with Gerolf Annemans, the author of the notorious '70-puntenplan' published in the beginning of the 1990s, a policy paper consisting of 70 articles.

In 2006, he was quoted in Bye-bye Belgium, which some Belgian politicians saw as a break of the cordon sanitaire.

In 2010, he participated in a conference in Israel organised by Likud on the fight against terrorism.

An extreme right-wing activist is sentenced to five years in prison in 2014 for planning the murder of Filip Dewinter, hoping to drag Belgium into civil war.

Views

Flemish nationalism and Nazi collaboration
On 6 November 1988, Filip Dewinter visited the Lommel German war cemetery where 40,000 bodies of Nazi Germany Wehrmacht soldiers of WW2 were buried. He and other members of his party, notably neo-Nazi Bert Eriksson, wanted to render respect and flower the graves of the 38 Flemish SS collaborators who fought for Nazi Germany and embraced fascist Nazi ideology. The Belgian police forces stopped the small rally and pushed them back; only holders of German citizenship were allowed to enter the cemetery. During a debate in 1992 at the University of Antwerp, Philip Dewinter mentioned some persons as his friends. Most of these persons were in the ranks of Nazis, anti Semites and other fascists like Bert Eriksson, Staf De Clercq or other men convicted for treason like Cyriel Verschaeve or August Borms.

Philip Dewinter was the guest speaker for a gathering of the former SS-collaborators of Sint-Maartensfonds which took place on 1 December 2001. That evening, Philip Dewinter opened his speech with the words "My Honour is loyalty" which was the official motto of the German SS-soldiers during WW2.

Dewinter has also been interviewed by the Israeli paper Haaretz. About the collaboration of Flemish nationalists during World War II he had to say:
Many Flemish nationalists collaborated during the war because they thought—and now it is clear that they were wrong—that this would help them achieve independence for Flanders. This is the whole story. The overwhelming majority were not Nazis. They collaborated in order to attain independence and because the Church called upon them to go out and fight the Communists—something that Western Europe continued to do for 50 years. Now, in 2005, it is easy to say: 'The collaboration was a mistake.' The collaboration did not help our country at all; we just became a vassal state of Germany. At the time, it was logical, because of the Church, because of communism. But this has no connection with Nazism.

In addition, as noted by the Stephen Roth Institute, Dewinter has been interviewed by the American radio talk show The Political Cesspool.

About the attendance of party members to ceremonies marking the death of Staf De Clercq he responded:
He is one of the historic leaders of the party. This is part of the history of the Flemish nationalist movement and it is impossible to deny this. We are the descendants of this movement. Some of the members of the party attend these events because they want to honor the heritage of the Flemish movement. This does not mean that they agree with Nazism. Not at all. I understand that this is hard to understand as a Jew. I respect very much that Jews have a problem with this. But Jews must also understand that this is not as simple as it seems. Not all of the [Nazi] collaborators wanted to kill the Jews in Europe. Most of the collaborators had other motives. I think that if they were living today, most of them would be ashamed of what happened to the Jews. The only thing I can do today is to say that I respect very much the suffering of the Jewish people, to express my sympathy and condolences about what happened and to try to move far away from this. But the Jewish people must understand that not every collaborator was necessarily anti-Semitic.

Judaism and Islam
A December 2005 interview by Dewinter with the American Jewish newsweekly The Jewish Week included a question if "Jews should vote for a party that espouses xenophobia". Dewinter responded by saying: "Xenophobia is not the word I would use. If it absolutely must be a 'phobia,' let it be 'Islamophobia.'" This statement, as well as the Blok's condemnation for racism, have weighted heavily on the French-speaking Belgian Socialist Party as well as other francophone and Flemish parties for them to become part of an appeal against the Vlaams Belang at the Council of State, an appeal that tries to take away the government subsidy of the Vlaams Belang.

In 2007 Dewinter took part in hosting the second international counter-jihad conference in Brussels in the European and Flemish Parliaments.

Quotes

"Vlaams Blok says: Our own people first!! And yes, Vlaams Blok chooses a Flemish Flanders. And yes, Vlaams Blok chooses a white Europe!" (Vlaams Blok-meeting, 1991).
"She who wears a hijab signs her 'return to sender' contract."
"He who sows the Koran reaps the jihad".
"[Immigrants] turn themselves into self pity. They become hostile, they cause nuisance and show criminal behaviour. In Flanders the multicultural society led to a multicriminal society."
"Staf de Clercq is one of the historical leaders of the Flemish national movement. Our party, the Vlaams Belang, is the continuator of this movement. We may not deny this past. Although I realise that it might be difficult for Jewish readers to understand, most collaborators thought that they could realise an independent Flanders by cooperating with the Germans. Most of them are ashamed of the horror they caused. The only thing I can do today is to show understanding for the suffering of the Jewish people."

Notes

External links

Vlaams Belang web site
resistances.be  

1962 births
Living people
Politicians from Bruges
Flemish activists
Belgian critics of Islam
Vlaams Belang MEPs
MEPs for Belgium 2009–2014
Right-wing populism in Belgium
Counter-jihad activists